Argobuccinum pustulosum, common name the pustular triton, is a species of predatory sea snail, a marine gastropod mollusk in the family Cymatiidae.

Description
The large swollen shell of this species has prominent varices.

The maximum recorded shell length of the synonym  Argobuccinum proditor tristanense is 80 mm.

Minimum recorded depth of the synonym Argobuccinum proditor tristanense is 0 m. Maximum recorded depth is 280 m.

References

Cymatiidae
Gastropods described in 1786